James Blackburn (10 August 1803 – 3 March 1854) was an English civil engineer, surveyor and architect best known for his work in Australia, where he had been  transported   as a sentence for forgery. According to the Australian Dictionary of Biography, Blackburn "has claims to be considered one of the greatest engineers of his period in Australia, and his architectural achievements established him as Tasmania's most advanced and original architect." He was key to the formation of the Department of Public Works in 1839, serving as one of its core members under Alexander Cheyne.

On 3 May 1841 he was pardoned, whereupon he entered private practice with James Thomson, another a former convict. Among the notable constructions of the firm was the swing Bridgewater Bridge completed in 1849. After that project, Blackburn and his family moved to Melbourne, where in addition to resuming his architect career and pursuing other business interests, he became city surveyor. His most notable effort in this role was the conception and design of a water supply system for Melbourne which drew from the Yan Yean Reservoir. Three years later, on 3 March 1854, Blackburn died of typhoid, with five of his ten children, eight of which had been born in Australia, surviving him.

Life
Blackburn was born on 10 August 1803 in Upton, West Ham, Essex, England. He was the third son born in a family of five children, four boys and one girl. His father and all of his brothers were scalemakers. At the age of 23, he was employed by the Commissioners of Sewers for Holborn and Finsbury and later on became an inspector of sewers. In 1833, suffering economic hardship, he forged a cheque for which he was convicted and transported to Van Diemen’s Land (Tasmania).

Blackburn was listed as a civil engineer and surveyor on the journey to Tasmania and was assigned to the Roads Department under Roderic O’Connor, a wealthy Irishman who was the Inspector of Roads and Bridges at the time.

In April 1843 Blackburn was assigned as an Engineer to the Roads Department according to an entry in the "Blue Book" in 1839. In August 1834 he handed in a report to the Government dealing with the water crisis which had been affecting the town of Launceston, Tasmania, for at least 10 years. In October of that year, Blackburn completed plans and sections which were proposed solutions to solve the crisis. In March 1835, the government still did not make up a decision. It was until half a year later when most people agreed on Blackburn’s proposal and in March 1836, constructions were finally put to work. Alexander Cheyne, who became the  Inspector of Roads and Bridges after the resignation of O’Connor in December 1835, expressed his confidence in Blackburn. "He is the only person I can depend upon to do many of the duties, and without his assistance I must necessarily have done them myself… He is the only person in the Department beside myself who can survey and level… I place more confidence in him than I could in the greater proportion of those who call themselves free… If Blackburn from being a convict is incapacitated from making enquiries, no time must be lost in supplying his place with a free person qualified to do the duties, if such can be found, which I doubt, in the colony."In August 1836, Blackburn’s detailed work had been examined by sixteen senior government officials and he was permitted a free pardon in January 1840 which became effective in May 1841.

Between 1839 and 1841, Blackburn was involved in the designs of Government buildings and churches. In 1841,  he was involved with the completion of Bridgewater Causeway. In August he submitted a proposal with James Thomson but further changes and delays were made. The project was finally begun in March 1847 and the bridge were opened in April 1849.

In April 1849, Blackburn sailed from Tasmania with his wife and ten children to  start a new life in Melbourne. In May Blackburn was aware of the polluted water pumped from Yarra River for sale directly causing a death rate of 20 per week. He proposed a red gum pipe could be introduced at the corner of Flinders and Elizabeth Streets as an allotment. The water would be directed to a tank and filtered to remove the pollutant before being sold to the public.
In July 1853, the construction of St Mark’s Church, began to designs by Blackburn and his son, also called James.

Due to the pollution of  the Yarra River, Blackburn submitted a report to the Council in August 1851 suggesting to bring water to Melbourne using gravity from the upper reaches of Plenty River. However, this proposal was declined and another scheme was chosen. Clement Hodgkinson, who had also suggested a scheme, studied Blackburn’s proposal and said: "After visiting the ground I have much pleasure in giving my humble testimony as to the care, industry and engineering talent displayed by Mr Blackburn." The Government accepted the recommendation and the work was carried out.

At the age of 51, James Blackburn died from typhoid, the same sickness which killed four of his sons and a daughter.

The Melbourne suburb of Blackburn may have been named after him.

Buildings
 The Grange at Campbell Town, Tasmania
1837 - Glenorchy Watch House - now demolished, Tasmania
1838 - St Mary's Kempton, Tasmania
1839 - Longford Gaol, Tasmania
1839 - Spring Hill Watch House, Tasmania
1839 - St Matthews, Glenorchy, Tasmania
 1839 - St Mark's Church, Pontville, Tasmania
1839 - St Matthew's Rokeby, Tasmania
1840 - St Andrew's, nave only, Westbury, Tasmania
1840 - Scots Presbyterian, Sorell, Tasmania
 1840 - 1847 - Holy Trinity Church, North Hobart, Tasmania
1841 - Holy Trinity Rectory, Hobart, Tasmania
1841 - Porticos on Public Offices, Murray St, Hobart, Tasmania
1841 - Holy Trinity, Launceston, Tasmania - now demolished
 1841 - Tower and vestries only, St George's Church, Battery Point, Tasmania
1842 - New Town Congregational Church, Tasmania
1842 - Lady Franklin Museum, Lenah Valley, Tasmania
1842 - Congregational Chapel, Bagdad, Tasmania
1842 - Congregational Chapel, Cambridge, Tasmania
1843 - Queen Mary Club, formerly Bank of Australasia, 143 - 145 Macquarie St, Hobart

Church projects

St Mark's, Pontville
St Mark's is an Anglican church in Pontville, Tasmania. It was sited by Governor Lachlan Macquarie, in 1821. It was designed by Blackburn in a distinctive neo-Norman style and built between 1839 and 1841 by Joseph Moir at a cost of approximately £2,600. It is constructed from local Brighton stone. The main façade incorporates a central Norman doorway flanked by raking arcades and low towers. The interior includes elaborately carved furniture by Hobart woodcarver Ernest Osborne.
Between the front two towers, effectively recessed by their juxtaposition is the entrance porch which comprises two central Tuscan columns supporting a segmented arch with zigzag decoration and inversely castellated cornice, reminiscent of a sun temple, with miniature raked colonnades either side.

It is unique, though architecturally it has affinities with at least two other Tasmanian churches,  the Presbyterian Church at Glenorchy and the New Town Congregational Church. The designs of those buildings mark the earliest colonial appearances of the Romanesque style in the history of Australian architecture.

Holy Trinity church, Hobart

Blackburn's Holy Trinity, at 50 Warwick Street, Hobart, Tasmania, is a good example of ecclesiastical construction in sandstone. It has one of the oldest sets of bell in Australia. The foundation stone was laid by John Franklin (Tasmanian Lieut-Governor) in 1841. Construction was completed in 1848. The church is in a Gothic Revival style. One of the most memorable aspects in the church is the war memorial window at the east end of the building designed by L. Dechaineux.

References

1803 births
1854 deaths
People from West Ham
English civil engineers
English surveyors
Deaths from typhoid fever
Recipients of British royal pardons
19th-century Australian architects
Convicts transported to Australia
 people convicted of forgery